Vacaria is a municipality in the Brazilian state of Rio Grande do Sul.

Vacaria may also refer to:

 Vacaria Airport, airport serving Vacaria, Brazil
 Roman Catholic Diocese of Vacaria, diocese located in Vacaria, Brazil
 Vacaria River, river in Mato Grosso do Sul, Brazil
 Vacaria River (Minas Gerais), river in Minas Gerais, Brazil
 Vacaria (footballer) (born 1994), Brazilian footballer

See also
 Văcăria River (disambiguation)
 Vacarius (1120-1200), Italian authority on civil and Canon law
 Vaccaria, monotypic genus of flowering plants